Queen of Siam may refer to:

 Queen of Siam (Lydia Lunch album), 1980
 Queen of Siam (Holy Moses album), 1986

See also
Queen consort of Siam